Hewlett is a surname. Notable people with the surname include:

Arthur Hewlett, actor
David Hewlett, British-born Canadian actor, writer, director and voice actor
Donald Hewlett, actor
Hilda Hewlett (1864–1943), aviation pioneer, wife of Maurice Hewlett
Jamie Hewlett, (born 1968) English comic book artist and co-creator of Tank Girl and Gorillaz
John Hewlett (1762–1844), English reverend and biblical scholar
Kate Hewlett, actress and David Hewlett's younger sister
Mark Hewlett, media personality
Matthew Hewlett, footballer
Maurice Hewlett, author, husband of Hilda Hewlett
 Richard G. Hewlett (1923–2015), American historian
 Richard Hewlett (American Revolutionary War) (1729–1789), Royalist soldier
Siobhan Hewlett, actress
Steve Hewlett (journalist) (1958–2017), British journalist
Thomas Hewlett (1882–1956), British Conservative Party politician and industrialist
Thomas Hewlett, Baron Hewlett (1923–1971), British industrialist and peer
W. H. Hewlett, composer, conductor, and organist
William Redington Hewlett (1913–2001), American engineer, co-founder of Hewlett-Packard
William Hewlett (regicide) 

English-language surnames
Surnames of Norman origin
Surnames of English origin